Lotte Lang (11 January 1900 – 13 February 1985) was an Austrian actress. She appeared in more than 80 films and television shows between 1932 and 1979.

Selected filmography

 Must We Get Divorced? (1933)
 Tales from the Vienna Woods (1934)
 Under Blazing Heavens (1936)
 Darling of the Sailors (1937)
 The White Dream (1943)
 Orient Express (1944)
 The Heart Must Be Silent (1944)
 The Millionaire (1947)
 We've Just Got Married (1949)
 Theodore the Goalkeeper (1950)
 The Midnight Venus (1951)
 Wedding in the Hay (1951)
 Shame on You, Brigitte! (1952)
 Season in Salzburg (1952)
 A Night in Venice (1953)
 The Stolen Trousers (1956)
 Big Request Concert (1960)
 Our Crazy Aunts (1961)
 Dance with Me Into the Morning (1962)
 Marry Me, Cherie (1964)
 In Bed by Eight (1965)

References

External links

1900 births
1985 deaths
Austrian film actresses
Actresses from Vienna
Austrian television actresses
20th-century Austrian actresses